"Don't Blink" is a song written by Casey Beathard and Chris Wallin and recorded by American country music artist Kenny Chesney.  It was released in September 2007 as the second single from Chesney's 2007 album Just Who I Am: Poets & Pirates.  The song became Chesney's thirteenth number one hit on the U.S. Billboard Hot Country Songs chart in late 2007.

The song debuted at #16 on the  U.S. Billboard Hot Country Songs chart for the week of September 8, 2007, setting a new record for the highest debut on that chart since the inception of SoundScan in 1990, beating a record set by Keith Urban's "Once in a Lifetime", which debuted at #17 in 2006. Chesney's record was broken one week later by Garth Brooks' "More Than a Memory", which debuted at number one on the country charts, the first song to do so in the chart's history.

The song also matches the fastest rising single of his career set in August 2007 with "Never Wanted Nothing More" taking eight weeks to reach number one.

On the Billboard Hot 100, "Don't Blink" debuted at number 79 on the chart dated September 22, 2007.

Content
The song's lyrics tell of a younger man's encounter with a 102-year-old man who was being interviewed on the news. The interviewer wants to know the older man's "secret to life", and the older man responds with "don't blink".

Music video
The music video was directed by Shaun Silva, and premiered on CMT on August 23, 2007. It features a man returning to his apartment where the news interview is playing on TV. He considers catching up on work, but what the old man says on TV apparently changes his mind and he decides to spend the time with his wife and son instead. Chesney performs the song outside the apartment, while home videos of life milestones for various people appear on the glass walls.

Critical reception
Kevin John Coyne of Country Universe gave the song an A+ grade, saying that this song "makes [Chesney] think about the greater truths and examine [his] own life from a new perspective. "

Chart performance
"Don't Blink" debuted at number 16 on the U.S. Billboard Hot Country Songs chart for the week of September 8, 2007.

Year-end charts

Certifications

References

2007 singles
Kenny Chesney songs
2007 songs
Country ballads
2000s ballads
Songs written by Casey Beathard
Music videos directed by Shaun Silva
Song recordings produced by Buddy Cannon
BNA Records singles
Songs written by Chris Wallin
Songs about old age